Mahmoud Abdel Monsef  is an Egyptian footballer who plays for Egyptian Premier League side Zamalek SC as a goalkeeper.

Honours
Zamalek SC

 Egypt Cup: 2017–18
 Saudi-Egyptian Super Cup: 2018

References

External links
 

Living people
Egyptian footballers
1997 births
Association football goalkeepers